The 1980 World trials season consisted of twelve trials events. It began on 9 February, with round one in Newtownards, Ireland and ended with round twelve in Ricany, Czechoslovakia on 14 September.

Season summary
Ulf Karlson would claim his first World trials championship in 1980, the first  World Championship for Montesa.

1980 World trials season calendar

Scoring system
Points were awarded to the top ten finishers. All twelve rounds counted for the World Trials class.

World Trials final standings

{|
|

References

Motorcycle trials
1980 in motorcycle sport